Tetro is a 2009 drama film written, produced and directed by Francis Ford Coppola and starring Vincent Gallo, Alden Ehrenreich and Maribel Verdú. Filming took place in 2008 in Buenos Aires, Patagonia, and Spain. An international co-production between the United States, Argentina, Spain and Italy, the film received a limited theatrical release in the U.S. on June 11, 2009.

Synopsis
Set in Argentina with a high content of film noir, this story of the reunion of two brothers follows the rivalries born out of creative differences passed down through generations of an artistic Italian immigrant family.

Cast
 Vincent Gallo as Tetro, the protagonist. Coppola said of his casting choice, "I know choosing Vincent Gallo to star in my film will raise a few eyebrows, but I'm betting that seeing him in the role will open some eyes." Prior to Gallo, Matt Dillon and Joaquin Phoenix were up for the role.
 Alden Ehrenreich as Bennie, Tetro's younger brother
 Maribel Verdú as Miranda, Tetro's girlfriend
 Silvia Pérez as Silvana
 Rodrigo de la Serna as José
 Érica Rivas as Ana
 Sofia Gala as Maria Luisa
 Carmen Maura as Alone, a literary critic and Tetro's mentor. The character was originally written to be male, and actor Javier Bardem was previously attached to the role. Coppola explained the change in sex, "As I read and reread (the script), I felt that the interaction between the two characters would be far more intriguing if they were of the opposite sex."
 Klaus Maria Brandauer as Alfie/Carlo Tetrocini, Tetro's father
 Mike Amigorena as Abelardo
 Lucas Di Conza as Young Tetro
 Adriana Mastrángelo as Angela
 Leticia Brédice as Josefina
 Francesca De Sapio as Amalia
 Susana Giménez as Herself

Production
In February 2007, Coppola announced that he would produce and direct the film Tetro, based on a script that he had written while editing Youth Without Youth. Production was scheduled to begin in Buenos Aires, Argentina in late 2007. Coppola was attracted to Argentina as a location, "I knew Argentina has a great cultural, artistic, literary, musical, cinema tradition, and I like those kinds of atmospheres very much because you usually find creative people to work with." Production did not begin as scheduled, and by March 2008, Vincent Gallo and Maribel Verdú joined the cast. The Spanish company Tornasol Films and the Italian company BIM Distribuzione signed with the director to co-produce the film. Production began on March 31, 2008 with a budget of $5 million, with Coppola using the production style similar to his previous film Youth Without Youth. Filming took place in La Boca in Buenos Aires and other parts of the capital city. Filming also followed in the Andean foothills in Patagonia and at the Ciudad de la Luz studios in Alicante, Spain. Production concluded in June.

In May 2008, during filming in Argentina, the Argentina Actors Association, an actors' union, claimed that production of Tetro was shut down due to union members working on the film without a contract. According to The Hollywood Reporter, "Local press reports say that script changes and communication problems between the multi-national cast and crew have extended filming days beyond regularly scheduled hours, and that some of the Argentine actors are still not certain of their salary." The director's spokesperson, Kathleen Talbert, denied that production was halted, saying, "There are no holds on shooting, no problem with actors. In fact, the majority of the Argentine actors have already wrapped the shooting." By the end of the month, the union said the issue was resolved, reporting, "The lawyers for the producers presented the necessary documentation and recognized the errors that they had made. So now they are able to continue with production." In contrast, Talbert reiterated that there had been no issue, and production was never halted.

The entire project was edited using Final Cut Pro on Apple Mac computers in a specially designed large screen edit suite built by Masa Tsuyuki.

The cast includes Rodrigo de la Serna, Leticia Brédice, Mike Amigorena and Jean-Francois Casanovas. The film features a brief cameo by Argentine film star Susana Giménez in her first performance after a ten-year hiatus from film acting.

Reception
The film received generally positive reviews from critics. On Metacritic, the film has an average score of 65/100 based on 26 reviews, indicating "generally favorable reviews". Rotten Tomatoes reported a 71% approval rating, based on 110 reviews with an average score of 6.40/10. The website's critics consensus reads: "A complex meditation on family dynamics, Tetros arresting visuals and emotional core compensate for its uneven narrative."

Roger Ebert of the Chicago Sun-Times gave the film 3 stars, praising the film for being "boldly operatic, involving family drama, secrets, generations at war, melodrama, romance and violence". Ebert also praised Vincent Gallo's performance and stated Alden Ehrenreich "inspires such descriptions as 'the new Leonardo DiCaprio' ". Todd McCarthy of Variety gave the film a B+ judging that "when [Coppola] finds creative nirvana, he frequently has trouble delivering the full goods." Richard Corliss of Time magazine gave the film a mixed review, praising Ehrenreich's performance, but claiming Coppola "has made a movie in which plenty happens but nothing rings true."

Tetro was sixth on the 2009 Cahiers du cinéma Top Ten list.

See also 
 List of Argentine films of 2009
 List of Spanish films of 2009

References

External links
 
 

2009 films
American Zoetrope films
2009 drama films
American drama films
English-language Argentine films
English-language Spanish films
Spanish drama films
Italian drama films
English-language Italian films
2000s English-language films
2000s Italian-language films
2000s Spanish-language films
Films directed by Francis Ford Coppola
Films produced by Francis Ford Coppola
Films set in Argentina
Films shot in Argentina
Films shot at Ciudad de la Luz
Films shot in Buenos Aires
Films with screenplays by Francis Ford Coppola
American multilingual films
Italian multilingual films
Spanish multilingual films
Argentine multilingual films
2009 multilingual films
2000s American films
2000s Spanish films
2000s Italian films